The Sheikh Zayed Book Award is a literary award begun in the UAE. It is presented yearly to "Arab writers, intellectuals, publishers as well as young talent whose writings and translations of humanities have scholarly and objectively enriched Arab cultural, literary and social life." The award was established in memory of Sheikh Zayed bin Sultan Al Nahyan, the principal architect of United Arab Emirates, the authoritarian ruler of Abu Dhabi and president of the UAE for over 30 years (1971–2004). The first award was in 2007. The total value of the prizes is  making it one of the richest literary awards in the world.

The "Cultural Person of the Year" is the premier category, it includes an award of one million Dirhams (around $300,000) while the other categories receive around $200,000 each.

Beginning with 2013 awards, a new category was added called "Arabic Culture in Other Languages" worth $205,000 "to honor best written works in Chinese, German and English languages on the subject of the Arabic civilization and culture including novels, short stories, poems, biographies, history and arts." In addition a number of other categories were merged, created or redefined.

In 2021, German philosopher Juergen Habermas declined his Zayed Book Award, citing the UAE's political system (a repressive non-democracy).

Winners
2007
Cultural Personality of the Year: Denys Johnson-Davies
Literature: Wacini Laredj, The Prince and the Passage of the Iron Doors
Fine arts: Tharwat Ukhasha, The Indian Art
Translation: Georges Zinaty, Althat a'inha Ka'khr (translated from French to Arabic)
Contribution to the Development of Nations: Bashir Mohamed Al-Khadra, The Prophetic – Caliphate Pattern in the Arab Political Leadership and Democracy
Young author: Mahmoud Zein Al-Abedeen, Architecture of the Ottoman Mosques
Children's literature: Mohammed Ali Ahmad, A Journey on Paper

2008
Cultural Personality of the Year: Mohamed Benaissa
Literature: Ibrahim al Kouni, Call of What Was Far
Fine arts: Rifat al-Chaderji, Dialectics and Causality of Architecture
Translation: Faiz Assayagh, Sociology
Young author: Mohamed Saadi, The Future of International Relations
Publishing and Distribution: Emirates Centre for Scientific Research and Studies
Children's literature: Huda Al-Shawwa Qadoumi, The Journey of Birds: To Qaf Mountain (about Mount Qaf)

2009
Cultural Personality of the Year: Pedro Martinez Montavez
Literature: Jamal Al Ghitani, Ren
Fine arts: Maher Rady, Thought of Light
Translation: Sa'ad Abdulaziz Maslouh, Translation Theory: Contemporary Trends (translation of Edwin Gentzler's Contemporary Translation Theories)
Contribution to the Development of Nations: Baqer Salman Al Najjar, The Strenuous Democracy in the Arabian Gulf
Young author: Youcef Oghlici, The Intricacy of Terminology in the New Arab Discourse
Publishing and Distribution: Dar Al Masriah Al Lubnaniah

2010
Cultural Personality of the Year: Khalid bin Mohammed Al Qasimi
Best Contribution to the Development of the Country: Ammar AM Hasan, The Political Establishment of Sufism in Egypt
Young author: Mohammad Al Mallakh, Time in Arabic Language: Its Linguistic Structure and Significance
Translation: Albert Habib Mutlaq, The Animal Encyclopedia
Fine arts: Iyad Al Husseini, The Art of Design
Children's literature: Qais Sedki, Gold Ring
Publishing and Distribution: Nahdet Misr Publishing and Printing
Literature: Hafnaoui Baali, Comparative Cultural Criticism- an Introduction (Note: Award withdrawn due to "research methodologies and ethics employed by the author" i.e. plagiarism)

2011
Cultural Personality of the Year: Xhong Jikun
Contribution to the Development of Nations: Abdul Raouf Sinno, Harb Lubnan 1975–1990
Literature: Mohammad Miftah, Mafaheem Muwasa'a Li Nazaryah Shi'ryah
Translation: Mohammad Ziyad Kibbeh, Al Tharwah wa lqtisad Al Ma'rifah (trans from Revolutionary Wealth by Alvin and Heidi Toffler)
Children's literature: Alaf Tabbalah, Al Bayt Wal Nakhlah

2012
Cultural Personality of the Year: UNESCO
Fine Arts: Shaker Abdel-Hamid, Art and Eccentrics
Translation: 
Young author: Layla Al Obaidi, Al Fakh in Islam ("Humor in Islam")
Publishing and Distribution: Brill Publishers
Best Technology in the Field of Culture: Paju Bookcity
Children's Literature: Abdo Wazen, The Boy Who Saw the Color of Air

2013
Cultural Personality of the Year: Ahmed el-Tayeb (Egypt)
Arab Culture in Non-Arabic Languages: Marina Warner (UK), Stranger Magic: Charmed States and the Arabian Nights
Translation: Fathi Meskini (Tunisia), Being and Time (from the German by Martin Heidegger)
Literary and Art Criticism: Abdullah Ibrahim (Iraq), Al Takhayol Al Tarikhi (Historic Visualization)
Publishing and Cultural Technologies: National Council for Culture, Arts and Literature, Kuwait
Best Contribution to the Development of the Country: Elizabeth Kassab (Lebanon), Contemporary Arab Thought (Arabic: Al Fikr al 'arabi al Mu'aser)
Young Author: Adil Hadjami (Morocco), Falsafat Jeel Deleuze ("Deleuze philosophy on Existentialism and Difference")

2014 
Cultural Personality of the Year: Abdullah bin Abdul Aziz, Ruler of the Kingdom of Saudi Arabia
Contribution to the Development of Nations: Saeed Abdullah Al Soyan for his study "The Epic of Human Evolution"
Children's Literature: Jawdat Fakhr Eldine for his book "Thirty Poems for Children"
Young Author: Rami Abu Shihab for his book "Permanence and Deception: Post-Colonial Discourse in the Contemporary Arab Criticism"
Translation: Mohammed Al Tahir Al Mansouri (Tunisia) for translating the book "Housing the Stranger in the Mediterranean World"
Literature: Abdel Rasheed Mahmoudi (Egypt) for his novel "After Coffee"
Literary and Art Criticism: (no award)
Arabic Culture in Other Languages: Mario Liverani (Italy) for his book "Imagining Babylon"
Publishing and Technology: Arab Foundation "House of Wisdom", from Tunisia

2015
Cultural Personality of the Year: Sheikh Mohammed bin Rashid Al Maktoum
Contribution to the Development of Nations: (no award)
Children's Literature: (no award)
Young Author: (no award)
Translation: Hanawa Haruo (Japan) for translating Naguib Mahfouz's Cairo Trilogy into Arabic
Literature: Osama Alaysa (Palestine) for his novel Majaneen bait lahem ("The fools of Bethlehem")
Literary and Art Criticism: (no award)
Arabic Culture in Other Languages: Sugita Hideaki (Japan) for Arabian-Naito to Nihon-Jin ("The Arabian Nights and the Japanese")  
Publishing and Technology: Arab Scientific Publishers Inc. (Lebanon)

2016
Cultural Personality of the Year: Amin Maalouf
Children's Literature: (no award)
Young Author: (no award)
Contribution to the Development of Nations: Jamal Sanad Al-Suwaidi (UAE) for Al-Sarab (The Mirage) 
Translation: Keyan Yahya (Iraq) for translation of The Meaning of Meaning by Ogden and Richards
Literature: Ibrahim Abdelmeguid (Egypt) for Ma Wara’a al-Kitaba (Beyond Writing)
Literary and Art Criticism: Said Yaktine for Al-Fikr al-Adabi al-‘Arabi (Arabic Literary Thought)
Arab Culture in Other Languages: Roshdi Rashed (Egypt) for Angles et Grandeur
Publishing and Technology: Dar Al-Saqi publishers of London

2017 
Cultural Personality of the Year: Abdallah Laroui
Children's Literature: Lateefa Buti (Kuwait) for Bila qubba’a (Hatless)
Young Author: (no award)
Contribution to the Development of Nations: Mohammad Chahrour (Syria) for Al Islam wal Insan (Islam and the Human Being)
Translation: Ziad Bou Akl (Lebanon/France) for translation from Arabic to French of Ibn Rushd, Al-Darûrî fî usûl al-fiqh (Averroès: Le Philosophe Et La Loi)
Literature: Abbas Beydoun (Lebanon) for Khareef al Bara’a (The Autumn of Innocence)
Literary and Art Criticism: Said Al Ghanimi (Iraq/Australia) for Fā‘iliyyat al-Khayāl al-Adabī (The Validity of Literary Fiction)
Arab Culture in Other Languages: David Wirmer for Vom Denken der Natur zur Natur des Denkens
Publishing and Technology: Kalimat Group, Sharjah, UAE

2018
Arabic Culture in Other Languages: Dag Nikolaus Hasse
Literature: Khalil Sweileh
Children's Literature: Hessa Al Muhairi
Literary and Art Criticism: Mohamed Mechbal
Translation: Naji Al 'Awnali
Publishing and Technology: Dar Al Tanweer
Cultural Personality of the Year: Arab World Institute
Young Author: Ahmad Al Qarmalawy

2019
Publishing and Technology: The Arabic Center for Geographic Literature "Irtiyad al-Afaq"
Cultural Personality of the Year: Jaroslav Stetkevych & Suzanne Stetkevych
Arabic Culture in Other Languages: Philip Kennedy
Children's Literature: Hussain Al Mutawaa
Literary and Art Criticism: Charbel Dagher
Literature: Bensalem Himmich
Young Author: Abderrazak Belagrouz

2020
Cultural Personality of the Year: Salma Khadra Jayyusi
Arabic Culture in Other Languages: Richard van Leeuwen
Translation: Mohamed Ait Mihoub
Children's Literature: Ibtisam Barakat
Young Author: Hayder Qasim
Publishing and Technology: Banipal
Literature: Moncef Ouahibi

2021
Arabic Culture in Other Languages: Tahera Qutbuddin
Children's Literature: Mizouni Bannani
Translation: Michael Cooperson
Literary and Art Criticism: Khelil Gouia
Literature: Iman Mersal
Contribution to the Development of Nations: Saeed El-Masry
Young Author: Asma bint Muqbel bin Awad Al-Ahmadi
Publishing and Technology: Dar Al Jadeed

References

External links

Awards established in 2007
Fiction awards
Non-fiction literary awards
Arabic literary awards
Emirati literary awards